Candler County Jail is a historic jail in Metter in Candler County, Georgia. The two-story brick building was constructed in 1916 as a jail and home for the sheriff. It is now used to house county service and emergency management agency operations. It was added to the National Register of Historic Places on November 7, 2002. It is located at 349 North Rountree Street.

See also
National Register of Historic Places listings in Candler County, Georgia

References

Jails on the National Register of Historic Places in Georgia (U.S. state)
Government buildings completed in 1916
Buildings and structures in Candler County, Georgia
National Register of Historic Places in Candler County, Georgia
Jails in Georgia (U.S. state)